Ponikva may refer to:

 Ponikva, Šentjur, a settlement in the Municipality of Šentjur, Slovenia
 Ponikva pri Žalcu, a settlement in the Municipality of Žalec, Slovenia
 Penk, a village in the community of Feistritz ob Bleiburg, Austria
 , ski resort on Mount Osogovo, North Macedonia

See also 
 Ponikwa (disambiguation)